Maybole railway station is a railway station serving the town of Maybole, South Ayrshire, Scotland. The station is owned by Network Rail and managed by ScotRail and is on the Glasgow South Western Line.

History 
The station was opened on 24 May 1860, originally as part of the Maybole and Girvan Railway (worked and later owned by the Glasgow and South Western Railway). The station replaced the original Maybole station, which was the original terminus of the Ayr and Maybole Junction Railway.

The station was originally a two side platform station rebuilt in 1880, with the two-storey main offices on the down platform, and a large single-storey building with glazed awning on the up platform. When the line was singled in 1973 the northbound platform was removed and the building demolished. The down platform and main building remain, part of which is a local convenience store and part used by Network Rail.

December 2019 

There is a regular hourly service in both directions to Ayr and Girvan(8 of which continue to Stranraer) on Monday to Saturdays

Ten of the northbound trains continue to Kilmarnock (and two extend to Glasgow Central via Barrhead).

On Sundays there are five trains each way, northbound to Ayr and southbound to Stranraer.

December 2020 
There are 12 trains per day in both directions to Ayr and Girvan(4 of which continue to Stranraer) on Monday to Saturdays.

Six of the northbound trains continue to Kilmarnock (and one extends to Glasgow Central via Barrhead).

Sunday services remain the same.

January 2021

Mon-Sat: There are nine trains per day northbound to Ayr/Kilmarnock and nine trains southbound to Girvan/Stranraer. Four trains continue to Kilmarnock. Three trains continue to Stranraer. Only the 0700 service from Stranraer continues further to Glasgow Central and the 0808 service from Glasgow Central continues to Stranraer. There is another service from Glasgow Central that terminates at Girvan at 18:56.

Sunday services remains the same.

Due to COVID-19 affecting signalling staff availability, the following services that call here were suspended/truncated in January 2021:

0621 Ayr - Girvan

0653 Girvan - Kilmarnock

1809 Glasgow Central to Stranraer

1903 Stranraer to Kilmarnock

2108 Kilmarnock - Girvan

2203 Girvan to Ayr

References

Notes

Sources

External links

Video, commentary and annotation on Maybole railway station

Railway stations in South Ayrshire
Railway stations in Great Britain opened in 1860
SPT railway stations
Railway stations served by ScotRail
Former Glasgow and South Western Railway stations
Maybole